Bradley Mark Emaus (born March 28, 1986) is an American former professional baseball second baseman. He played in Major League Baseball (MLB) for the New York Mets.

College career
Drafted by the Atlanta Braves in the 18th round of 2004 Major League Baseball draft out of East Coweta High School in Sharpsburg, Georgia, Emaus instead elected to enroll at Tulane University.  Playing for the Tulane Green Wave baseball team, he started every game his first two seasons, playing mostly third base and some first base.  In 2005, his freshman season, he was named to the All-Conference USA Tournament Team.  In 2006, he played collegiate summer baseball in the Cape Cod Baseball League for the Yarmouth-Dennis Red Sox and was named a league all-star. In his junior season, he continued to play well — albeit displaying less extra base power — at second base, and re-entered the draft, this time being selected by the Toronto Blue Jays in the eleventh round.

Professional career

Toronto Blue Jays
In 2009, the Blue Jays had also assigned him to play in the Arizona Fall League.  By 2010, Emaus has batted .276 in his minor league career, with a .364 on-base percentage, and a .426 slugging percentage, reaching as high 89 games with the Las Vegas 51s of the AAA Pacific Coast League.  As a minor leaguer, he has mostly played second base, with a small amount of time also logged at third.

A good performance in Arizona, along with his AAA statistics and a solid showing (.978 OPS) for the Blue Jays in spring training 2010, suggested he was a good candidate to become a major league player, but the Blue Jays did not include him on their 40-man roster, thus exposing him to the Rule 5 Draft.  The Mets, thin at second base with the disappointing performance and questionable health of Luis Castillo at second base for them in 2011, chose Emaus in the first round of the draft.

New York Mets
Coming to the Mets in this manner, Emaus had to remain on their major league 25-man roster for the duration of 2011, or else be offered back to the Blue Jays. Emaus won the Mets second base competition during 2011 Spring Training. He was the Opening Day starter, making his major league debut on April 1. On April 19, the Mets designated Emaus for assignment.

Colorado Rockies
On April 21, 2011, after clearing waivers, Emaus was returned to the Toronto Blue Jays.  However, the next day he was traded to the Colorado Rockies for RHP Chris Malone and a player to be named later.

Boston Red Sox
On January 11, 2012, Emaus was traded to the Boston Red Sox for a player to be named later or cash considerations.  Less than three months later, on April 4, he was released.

Laredo Lemurs
He subsequently signed with the Laredo Lemurs of the American Association of Independent Professional Baseball on April 18, 2012.

Return to New York Mets
On April 25, 2012 Emaus signed a minor league contract with the New York Mets to play for the Buffalo Bisons, their AAA affiliate.

Post-playing career
Following his playing career, Emaus opened up 643 Hitting Academy in his residence of Monroe, Louisiana.

See also
Rule 5 draft results

References

External links

1986 births
Living people
Auburn Doubledays players
Baseball players from Michigan
Buffalo Bisons (minor league) players
Colorado Springs Sky Sox players
Dunedin Blue Jays players
Las Vegas 51s players
Major League Baseball second basemen
New Hampshire Fisher Cats players
New York Mets players
Phoenix Desert Dogs players
Sportspeople from Kalamazoo, Michigan
Tulane Green Wave baseball players
Yarmouth–Dennis Red Sox players